David Felix Waldstein (10 January 1865 – 8 December 1943) was a German lawyer and liberal politician, a member of the Prussian and German parliament and the Weimar National Assembly.

Waldstein was born in Gnesen, Prussian Province of Posen (Gniezno, Poland), after passing his Abitur in Gnesen he studied law and economics  at the Humboldt University Berlin. Waldstein started to work as a lawyer in Altona in 1890 and as notary in 1901. He was elected as a member of the Prussian House of Representatives in 1908 and a member of the  German Reichstag in 1912.

In 1919 Waldstein became a member of the Weimar National Assembly and member of the executive board of the German Democratic Party, he remained in the Weimar German Reichstag until February 1921. Waldstein was a member of the national executive board and chairman of the Hamburg section of the Centralverein deutscher Staatsbürger jüdischen Glaubens (CV). He headed the Centralverein in North-West Germany until 1934.

In 1939 Waldstein emigrated to the United Kingdom and died in London in 1943.

References

1865 births
1943 deaths
People from Gniezno
People from the Province of Posen
Jewish German politicians
German Free-minded Party politicians
Progressive People's Party (Germany) politicians
German Democratic Party politicians
Humboldt University of Berlin alumni
Members of the Prussian House of Representatives
Members of the 13th Reichstag of the German Empire
Members of the Weimar National Assembly
Members of the Reichstag of the Weimar Republic
Jewish emigrants from Nazi Germany to the United Kingdom